Senator Meier may refer to:

Bill Meier (born 1940), Texas State Senate
Curt Meier (born 1953), Wyoming State Senate
Raymond A. Meier (born 1952), New York State Senate

See also
Robert W. Miers (1848–1930), Indiana State Senate
Senator Mayer (disambiguation)
Senator Meyer (disambiguation)